Thomas Daniel Schlee (born October 26, 1957) is an Austrian composer, arts administrator, and organist.

Life and work
Schlee was born in Vienna as the elder of two sons of the Austro-German musicologist, theater scientist and music publisher Alfred Schlee (1901–1999) and of Margaret Molner. Therefore already from his early childhood on he has been in close contact with a large number of important personalities of the music of the 20th century. He studied at the University of Music and Performing Arts, Vienna with Michael Radulescu and Erich Romanovsky.  He then earned a PhD in musicology and art history at Vienna University.  During 1977–78, Schlee was an auditor in Olivier Messiaen's composition class in Paris and studied privately with composer and organist Jean Langlais. Upon returning to Austria, he also studied with composer Francis Burt.

From 1986 to 1989,  Schlee was dramatic advisor for music at the Salzburger Landestheater, 1988–90 he taught at the University for Music and Performing Arts Vienna and at the Institute for Musicology at the Salzburg University. From 1990 to 1998 he was Music Director at the Linzer Brucknerhaus and Artistic Director of the International Bruckner Festival in Linz. From 1995 on he worked for the Guardini Foundation Berlin and was Scientific Director of the international project “La Cité céleste”, dedicated to Olivier Messiaen. In that position he was responsible for exhibitions, concerts, competitions, monograph, lectures and symposia in 15 European cities. From 1998 to 2001 he was head of the Guardini Foundation, from 2004 to 2011 head of the advisory committee for music. From 1999 to 2003 Schlee was Vice General Manager of the International Beethoven Festival in Bonn. After this he was General Manager of the Carinthischer Sommer from 2004 to 2015 as well as a member of the university committee of the Mozarteum Salzburg (2008–2013).

The composer
As a composer, Schlee has written works in all forms, which have been published by Bärenreiter, Lemoine, Leduc, Universal Edition, Doblinger etc.

He got commissions among others from Gesellschaft der Musikfreunde Vienna, Vienna Konzerthausgesellschaft, Süddeutscher Rundfunk (SDR), Camerata Salzburg, Ensemble 20. Jahrhundert, Wiener Musiksommer, Mürztaler Werkstatt, Upper Austrian Stiftskonzerte, Mariahilf-Kultur Graz, Cappella Nova Graz, Copenhagen Philharmonic, Göttingen Symphony Orchestra, Württembergische Philharmonie Reutlingen, International Beethovenfeste Bonn, International Organ Week Nürnberg, Siemens Arts Program, Guardini Foundation Berlin, Theater an der Wien Vienna, University of Music Graz, kunsthaus muerz, Ensemble die reihe, Bachfest Salzburg 2008, Southwest German Philharmonic Konstanz, Staatsorchester Stuttgart, Deutsche Staatsphilharmonie Rheinland Pfalz, Gewandhaus zu Leipzig, International Barocktage Melk, and Musiktage Mondsee. In 1997/1998 Schlee was Composer in Residence of the Vienna Concert Verein.

His music was performed by interpreters like Roger Norrington, Riccardo Chailly, Wladimir Fedossejew, Bertrand de Billy, Placido Domingo, Franz Welser-Möst, Pinchas Steinberg, Dennis Russell Davies, Sándor Végh, Manfred Honeck, Ralf Weikert, Leopold Hager, Christian Simonis, Lothar Zagrosek, Heinz Karl Gruber, Zoltán Kocsis, Philippe Herreweghe, Maurice André, Heinrich Schiff, Ursula Holliger, Ildikó Raimondi, Bernarda Fink, Wolfgang Schulz, Walter Auer, Sharon Bezaly, Michael Martin Kofler, Silvia Careddu, Hansjörg Schellenberger, Marie-Luise Modersohn, Andreas Schablas, Milan Turkovic, Michael Schade, Markus Schäfer, Alexander Krichel, Auryn Quartett, Quatuor Danel, Wiener Streichquartett, Klangforum Wien, Ensemble die reihe, Soloists of Sächsische Staatskapelle Dresden and many others.

The organist
As an organist Thomas Daniel Schlee performed intensely throughout Europe, was soloist at renowned international festivals, recorded for radio and CDs (Diapason d'Or 10 de répertoire, and the German Record Critics' Award. He also is a jurymember at distinguished competitions.

Major works
Bild und Gleichnis op. 92 (2019/20) for organ
Das Gewand des Messias op. 91 (2018/19) for piano trio
Sancta Trinitas, unus Deus op. 90 (2018/19) for organ
Three Marches, two Trios, and a Waltz, op. 88 (2015/17) for orchestra
String Quartet Nr.4, op. 86 (2014/15)
Suite, op. 82 (2012/13) for violin and piano
Symphony No.2, op. 81 (2010/13) for large orchestra
"Aus meines Herzens Grunde", WoO (2012) for organ, in: The Orgelbüchlein Project
"Rufe zu mir", op. 80 (2011/12) for organ and large orchestra
Horai, op. 79 (2011/12) for organ and chamber orchestra
"Was wir sind", op. 77 (2010/11), cantata for children's choir and orchestra
Wachsende Bläue, op. 76 (2010), for two solo violins and string ensemble
String Trio, op. 75 (2008/11)
2 Psalms, op. 74 (2004/10) for organ
"Tränen", op. 73 (2003/09), nine dances for piano
Concerto for piano and orchestra, op. 70 (2008)
"Ich, Hiob", op. 68 (2006/07), church opera
Sinfonia tascabile, op. 67 (2006) for orchestra
Konzertoverture, Musik für ein Fest, op. 64 (2005) for orchestra
Missa, op. 61 (2005) for baritone solo, mixed choir, brass, percussion, and organ
Die schöne Lau, op. 60 (2004) for soprano, speaker, and orchestra
String Quartet Nr. 3 "Tempus Floridum" op. 56 (2003)
und ich sah, op. 55 (2002–03) oratorio for soloists, chorus, and ensemble
Der Kreuzweg unseres Herrn und Heilandes, op. 52 (2001) for organ and string orchestra
Symphony No. 1, op. 51 (2000–01) for orchestra
De Profundis for viola and double bass, Op.43 (2000)
Der Esel Hesékiël, op. 46 (1998–99) for narrator and orchestra
Orchesterspiele, op. 45 (1997–98) for orchestra
Sonata da Camera, op. 42 (1996–97) for chamber orchestra
Licht, Farben, Schatten, op. 38 (1995–96) for ensemble
Concertino, op. 36 (1995) for two piccolo trumpets (or oboes) and string orchestra
Wacht auf, Harfe und Saitenspiel, op. 35 (1994–95) for harp and string orchestra
Der Baum des Heils, op. 33 (1993–94), oratorio
Aurora, op. 32 (1992–93) for orchestra
Ricercar, op. 31 (1990–92) for orchestra
Cinq Pièces , op. 29 (1990–92) for organ
Das Feuer des Herrn, op. 27 (1989) cantata for soloists, children's chorus, and chamber orchestra
 Alba for flute and viola, Op.26 (1986)
String Quartet Nr. 2 op. 21 (1983–85, rev. 1997) 
... und mit einer Stimme rufen, op. 20 (1987) for orchestra

Decorations and awards
1982 Promotion Prize for Music of Vienna
1983 First prize in the composition competition of the Berlin Liedertafel
1985 winner of the Composition Competition of Erding
1989 winner of the Organ Composition Competition "Olivier Messiaen" Bologna
1990 Chevalier of the Order of Arts and Letters (France)
1997 Joaquin Rodrigo Medal
1998 Culture Prize of Upper Austria
2002 Church Music Prize from the city of Neuss
2003 Funding Prize for Music of the Austrian Federal Chancellery
2005 Officer of the Order of Arts and Letters (France)
2007 Cultural Medal of Upper Austria
2010 Austrian Music Award
2012 Austrian Cross of Honour for Science and Art
2015 Grand decoration of honour in gold of the Federal State of Carinthia

Discography (selection) 
 „Cech. Ligeti. Schlee“, ORF CD 46 (1995): Ricercar
 „Meisterliche Konzerte“, DD Records CD DD945182 (1996): Wacht auf, Harfe und Saitenspiel
 „Das Spiel mit der Oboe“, Weinberg Records CD SW 010058-2 (1997): Aulodie et Jubilation
 Der Baum des Heils, Extraplatte CD EX 320-2 (1997)
 „Thomas Daniel Schlee“, ORF Edition Zeitton CD 274 (2001): 2. Streichquartett, Préludes op. 6/III, IV, Dann steht der Mandelbaum in Blüte, Das Feuer des Herrn
 „Aurora“, Extraplatte CD EX-SP 020-2 (2002): Licht, Farbe Schatten, Quia tu es Deus fortitudo mea, Alba, Wacht auf, Harfe und Saitenspiel, Aurora
 „New Music from Austria“ IV, ORF Edition Zeitton CD 325 (2003): Orchesterspiele
 Reine Gegenwart, ORF Edition Zeitton CD 329 (2003)
 „Paradisfloden“, Rondo Records RCD 8376 (2005): Cantus (Trompete und Orgel)
 Missa op. 61, CD Domradio Köln (2005)
 Canticum Sancti Floriani Martyris (Kropfreiter/Schlee), CD ORGANpromotion OP 8001 (2006)
 Vom Abend zum Morgen, Audiomax 703 1545-2 (2009)
 Ich, Hiob, paladino music pmr 0002 (2010)
 „vielstimmig“ No. 5, HeiVo LC 16167 CD 104 (2010): In jener Zeit
 „Neue Musik aus Salzburg 2006–09“, CD ORF/Universität Mozarteum/IGNM (2010): Sicut ros Hermon
 Sept pièces blanches, Seefelder Präludium, CD Gramola 98976 (2012)
 Körper in Cafés, ORF CD 3149 (2013)
 „Thomas Daniel Schlee: Organ Works“ (Pier Damiano Peretti an der Cavaillé-Coll Orgel der Trinité in Paris), Ambiente-Audio ACD-2030 (2013): Préludes op. 6 / I, II, IV, VII, IX, XI, Fantaisie op. 15, Zwei Psalmen op. 74

References

External links
 Thomas Daniel Schlee page at his principal publisher Baerenreiter
 Thomas Daniel Schlee at 60, article in takte magazine
 "Exclamation Mark of the Heart" – Thomas Daniel Schlee at 60, article in Wiener Zeitung
 Thomas Daniel Schlee: Portrait at music austria

1957 births
Living people
20th-century classical composers
21st-century classical composers
Austrian classical composers
Austrian classical organists
Academic staff of the University of Salzburg
University of Vienna alumni
University of Music and Performing Arts Vienna alumni
Officiers of the Ordre des Arts et des Lettres
Recipients of the Austrian Cross of Honour for Science and Art
Austrian male classical composers
20th-century male musicians
21st-century male musicians